Riya (born February 18) is a female Japanese singer from Fukuoka, Japan. In her early career, she admired Akino Arai. Riya eventually became the lead singer and lyricist to the J-pop band Eufonius, which debuted in 2003.

Solo discography

Singles 
 "Toki no Mukōgawa", Released March 24, 2005 by Lantis

Albums 
 Sorarado, Released on December 28, 2003
 Sorarado Append, Released on December 28, 2004
 Love Song, Released August 31, 2005 by Key Sounds Label

Other songs 
 "Mawaru Sekai de" (duet with Haruka Shimotsuki; opening theme to PlayStation 2 game Akai Ito)
 "Tabiji no Hate" (duet with Haruka Shimotsuki; ending theme to Akai Ito)
 "Dianoia" (opening theme to PC game Saishū Shiken Kujira)
 "Crescent Moon" (opening theme to Dreamcast & PlayStation 2 game Suigetsu ~mayoigokoro~)
 "Mag Mell" (opening theme to Clannad)
 "-Kage Futatsu-" ("-Two Shadows-")/ "Chiisana Tenohira" (ending theme to Clannad)
 "Hikari no Hō e ~Ashita e no Jumon~ (opening theme to PlayStation 2 game Mabino x Style)
 "Narcissus" (opening theme to Narcissu: Side 2nd)
 "Apocrypha" (opening theme to Shinkyoku Sōkai Polyphonica)
 "Reflectia" (opening theme to True Tears and, in a modified version, as an insert song for Tari Tari)
 "Hiyoku no Hane" (opening theme to Yosuga no Sora)

References

External links 
  

Anime musicians
Japanese women singers
Lantis (company) artists
Living people
Musicians from Fukuoka Prefecture
Year of birth missing (living people)